JAM Liner Inc. is a bus company that serves direct routes from Manila to provinces of Laguna, Batangas and Quezon. Dennise Trajano serves as JAM Liner's President and CEO as well as Philtranco Services Enterprises, Incorporated.

Etymology 
The name JAM Liner came from the first letter of its founders', Josefina Mercado and her husband, Artemio Mercado, first name and surname.

History 

JAM Liner was started on April 7, 1968 by Artemio Mercado and his wife, Josefina Mercado with only four buses. They initially served the Biñan, Laguna to Manila route. By then, the Mercados expanded their bus transport business in Laguna. It came to the point that around 30 percent of the province's transportation services were theirs.

In 1990, they increase their bus network to the provinces of Quezon, Batangas, Camarines Sur, Albay and Sorsogon. They had grown their franchises to around 290 bus units.

However, in 2000, the Jose “Pepito” Ch. Alvarez-led Penta Pacific Realty Corporation took over the management. Chavez integrated JAM Liner's operations with Philtranco Services Enterprises, Inc., a bus company that Penta Pacific also bought out in 1999.

Despite the integration of these two bus companies, JAM Liner and Philtranco run by their own set of company structures, management and subsidiaries. JAM Liner is operated under JAM Group of Companies with their subsidiaries: JAM Liner, JAM Transit, Phil Tourister and First Charters and Tours Transport Corporation; while Philtranco Services Enterprises Inc. has its own subsidiaries: Philtranco, Phikargo, and Amihan Bus Lines. The company was later headed by its president and CEO, Dennise Trajano.

JAM Liner, along with Philtranco became innovative in their ticketing services with their ventures to VMoney, and Smart's Pinoy Travel.

In 2013, The Dawn composed and perform their company theme song entitled "JAM Tayo" (Tagalog: Let's Jam).

In 2015, JAM Liner had a joint venture with SM Investments Corporation in expanding their operations to Cebu. The joint venture formed the Metro Rapid Transit Service Inc. or known as "Cebu MyBus". A bus rapid transit system with services within SM Seaside City, SM City Cebu, Mactan–Cebu International Airport, to key cities along Metro Cebu and vice versa. It was JAM Liner's first expansion to Visayas and one of their biggest attempt in the region which is predominated by the country's largest, Yanson Group of Bus Companies.

In 2016, JAM Liner along with QRS Logistics and University of the Philippines had their own basketball team for the PBA Developmental League as UP-QRS-JAM. Majority of their team members are from UP Maroons who played for UAAP Basketball Games. In March, JAM Liner along with their alliances Philtranco and FastCat unveiled their modernization program in aiming to link Luzon, Visayas and Mindanao. Accordingly, Philtranco and JAM Liner envisioned having a fleet of 1000 with FastCat as their partner in sea to expand their road network, nationwide.

In 2021, JAC Liner acquired JAM Liner Inc. and JAM Transit to expand their route network.

Fleet 
JAM Liner utilizes buses that are made from a local coach builder, Santarosa Motor Works Philippines and some of them have surplus Korean buses which were also modified into Santarosa Daewoo facemask.
 Kia Asia AM928
 Kia Granbird
 Daewoo BH116
 Daewoo BH115E
 Nissan Diesel Euro Trans
 Santarosa Nissan Diesel Euro Bus
 Santarosa Daewoo BH117H
 Santarosa Daewoo BS120S
 Santarosa Daewoo BV115
 Santarosa Daewoo BS106
 Santarosa Daewoo BF106
 Santarosa MAN Modulo
 Santarosa MAN Explorer
 Santarosa UD Nissan Diesel PKB212
 Santarosa UD Nissan Diesel EXFOH
 Yutong ZK6107HA
 Yutong ZK6119H2

Terminals 

 JAM Liner Buendia Station, 2124 Taft Avenue, Pasay
 JAM Liner Cubao Station, 831 EDSA, Kamuning, Sacred Heart, Quezon City
 Sto. Domingo, Biñan, Laguna
 Bolbok, Batangas City
 Talipan, Pagbilao, Quezon
 National Highway, Turbina, Calamba, Laguna
 J. Katigbak Street, Mataas na Lupa, Lipa, Batangas
 Purok 1, Palanas, Lemery, Batangas
 National Highway cor. Diezmo Road, Pulo, Cabuyao, Laguna

Destinations

Metro Manila 
 LRT Taft Avenue, Buendia, Pasay
 Parañaque Integrated Terminal Exchange, Parañaque City
 Cubao/Kamias, Quezon City

Provincial destinations 
 Balibago, Santa Rosa, Laguna
 Santa Rosa Integrated Terminal, Santa Rosa, Laguna
 Turbina, Calamba, Laguna
 Biñan, Laguna
 Cabuyao, Laguna
 Lucena, Quezon
 Pagbilao, Quezon
 Batangas City
 Lemery, Batangas
 Lipa, Batangas SM Lipa Grand Terminal/Robinsons Place Lipa
 Pacita Complex, San Pedro, Laguna (Under Phil Touristers Inc.)

Inter-provincial routes 
 Turbina (Calamba)–Batangas City via vice veresa

Former destinations 
 Santa Cruz, Laguna (Laguna Trans subsidiary)
 EDSA Kamuning, Quezon City

Subsidiaries 
Their subsidiaries as of 2000:
 JAM Transit
 JAC Liner

See also 
 List of bus companies of the Philippines
 Philtranco
 JAC Liner

References

External links 
 http://jam.com.ph/

Bus companies of the Philippines
1968 establishments in the Philippines
Companies based in Santa Rosa, Laguna